

Albums

Studio albums
As main artist

As featured artist

EPs

Singles

Promotional singles

Other songs

See also
 List of awards and nominations received by Billy Bob Thornton
 Billy Bob Thornton filmography

References

External links
BillyBobThornton.net
TheBoxmasters.com

Discographies of American artists
Country music discographies